Old Swedes' Church may refer to:

Holy Trinity Church (Old Swedes) in Wilmington, Delaware
Gloria Dei (Old Swedes') Church in Philadelphia, Pennsylvania
St. James Kingsessing in Philadelphia, Pennsylvania is often called "Old Swedes"
Trinity Church (Old Swedes' Church) in Swedesboro, New Jersey